Syed Shabia Al Hasnain is a Pakistani politician who is currently serving as a member of the Gilgit-Baltistan Council since 12 November 2021. He belongs to Pakistan Tehreek-e-Insaf (PTI).

References

Living people
Pakistan Tehreek-e-Insaf politicians
Members of the Gilgit-Baltistan Council
Year of birth missing (living people)
People from Astore District